The Gizmondo was a handheld game console that was developed and sold by Tiger Telematics. Only 14 games were ultimately released for the Gizmondo, in part due to the system's commercial failure. The Gizmondo was launched on March 19, 2005, in Europe. In North America the Gizmondo launched on October 22, 2005. The Gizmondo's sales were poor, with fewer than 25,000 units sold. By February 2006 it was discontinued when Tiger Telematics, the manufacturer of Gizmondo, was forced into bankruptcy. Because of this every game released in North America was a launch title, and all other games in development were never released.

Games

Cancelled games

References

Gizmondo